Marl-Chemiepark Power Station is an ensemble of three thermal power stations. One of these power stations has a 300 meters tall, another a 241 meters tall chimney.

The 300 meters chimney was demolished in 1995, using a special excavator.

External links

 abbruchtechnik.de 

Coal-fired power stations in Germany
Chimneys in Germany
Economy of North Rhine-Westphalia